Callum is a Scottish given name and surname.

Callum may also refer to:

Callum (Thrace), a settlement and station (mutatio) of ancient Thrace, inhabited during Byzantine times. Its site is located east of Selymbria in European Turkey.
Callum, Ontario, Canada
Callum (bivalve), a part of certain bivalve seashells

See also
Calum, orthographic variant of the name
Callum Brae, a suburb in Hamilton, New Zealand